Peter Godsday Orubebe (born 6 June 1959) was appointed Nigerian Minister of Niger Delta on 6 April 2010 when acting president Goodluck Jonathan announced his new cabinet.

Background
Orubebe was born on 6 June 1959 at Ogbobagbene, Burutu Local Government Area in Delta State. He is of Ijaw descent. He attended the University of Lagos, gaining a B.Sc. in political science in 1985. Later he obtained a master's degree in international relations from Ambrose Alli University, Ekpoma in 2005.

Political career
Orubebe became a supervisory councilor, and later chairman of Burutu LGA. In July 2007, President Umaru Yar'Adua appointed him Minister of Special Duties. Later he became Minister of State for Niger Delta Affairs when that ministry was created in December 2008.
In January 2010, he said that the proposed 10% equity share policy on infrastructural development in the Niger Delta region would make vandalism and crisis a thing of the past.

Controversy
On 31 March 2015, Orubebe, acting as a polling agent for the PDP, made attempts at disrupting the proceedings of the 2015 presidential election collation. Orubebe alleged that INEC Chairman, Attahiru Jega, had taken side with the main opposition political party, APC. He however subsequently apologized to Nigerians over his conduct by tendering  an unreserved apology  urging them not to follow in his footsteps and explaining that he regretted his action.

References

1959 births
Living people
Federal ministers of Nigeria
Delta State politicians
Ijaw people
Ambrose Alli University alumni
University of Lagos alumni